The Garshasp-nama is an epic poem by Asadi Tusi (died 1072/73). It has been described as one of the best epic poems in Persian literature, comparable to Shahnameh, by Ferdowsi, and the most important work of Asadi Tusi. Asadi Tusi completed the poem in 1066 and dedicated it to a certain Abu Dulaf, the ruler of Nakhjavan (nothing is known about him). The poem has also been translated to other languages such as French and German. It seems that Asadi Tusi wrote this poem based on a written source. Like the Shahnameh, it contains few Arabic loan-words and consists of some 9,000 verses. The main hero of this epic poem is Garshasp, the son of Etret, and grandson of Sām. The poem begins with the story of Jamshid and Zahhak. Jamshid is overthrown by Zahhak and flees to Zabolistan. In Zabolistan, Jamshid falls in love with an unnamed daughter of Kurang, the king of Zabolistan, and she bore a child for Jamshid, named Tur (not to be confused with Tur, the son of Freydun). Jamshid flees again to China. Garshasp is actually the grandson of Tur's grandson.

References

Sources

Further reading 
 
 
 

Epic poems in Persian
11th-century books
Persian mythology
Persian literature